Dirty Linen is a 1999 Italian comedy film directed by Mario Monicelli. It was entered into the 21st Moscow International Film Festival.

Plot
An extended family in Le Marche reunites as the old father and leader of the family candy business is about to leave control of the company to his sons. The siblings hate each other and compete for the succession, to the point of ultimately placing a bomb in the villa and destroying everything, after the final choice is made.

Cast
 Paolo Bonacelli as Amedeo
 Marina Confalone as Lina
 Alessandro Haber as Genesio
 Benedetta Mazzini as Giada
 Mariangela Melato as Cinzia
 Gianni Morandi as himself
 Ornella Muti as Bruna
 Michele Placido as Furio Cimin
 Gigi Proietti as Prof. Rodolfo Melchiorri
 Pia Velsi as Isolina
 Kassandra Voyagis as Fiore (as Mimmalovai Kassandra Voyagis)

References

External links
 

1999 films
1999 comedy films
Italian comedy films
Italian satirical films
1990s Italian-language films
Films directed by Mario Monicelli
Films scored by Luis Bacalov
Films about families
Films with screenplays by Suso Cecchi d'Amico
1990s Italian films